Skryne Church is a ruined medieval church and National Monument in County Meath, Ireland.

Location

History
A monastery named Achall (after the legendary Achall) was on this site at an earlier date. The shrine of Columba (Colm Cille) or maybe some of his relics, was brought here in the 10th century for safe keeping, so it acquired the name Scrín Choluim Chille (Colmcille's Shrine; from Latin scrīnium). The monastery was plundered at least six times by various raiders, but it continued to run even after the Norman conquest of Ireland. Adam de Feypo, first Baron Skryne, founded a church dedicated to Nicholas of Myra and endowed it upon his brother Thomas, who joined the Cistercians of St. Mary's Abbey, Dublin. St Mary's held Skryne up until the Dissolution of the Monasteries in 1534.

Skryne Church was built in 1341 as a house of Augustinians by Francis de Feypo, the last de Feypo Baron Skryne. The tower was added in the 15th century.

Church
The church is a nave and chancel with mural stairs to a rood screen and an arched tomb recess. A carving of a man is near the door, possibly Colm Cille. The bell tower is three storeys high and has a base-batter. It contains fragments of a baptismal font and a tomb slab. A medieval cross stands nearby.

Gallery

References

Archaeological sites in County Meath
National Monuments in County Meath
Former churches in the Republic of Ireland
Ruins in Ireland
Churches in County Meath